Character encoding detection, charset detection, or code page detection is the process of heuristically guessing the character encoding of a series of bytes that represent text. The technique is recognised to be unreliable and is only used when specific metadata, such as a HTTP  header is either not available, or is assumed to be untrustworthy.

This algorithm usually involves statistical analysis of byte patterns, like frequency distribution of trigraphs of various languages encoded in each code page that will be detected; such statistical analysis can also be used to perform language detection. This process is not foolproof because it depends on statistical data.

In general, incorrect charset detection leads to mojibake.

One of the few cases where charset detection works reliably is detecting UTF-8. This is due to the large percentage of invalid byte sequences in UTF-8, so that text in any other encoding that uses bytes with the high bit set is extremely unlikely to pass a UTF-8 validity test. However, badly written charset detection routines do not run the reliable UTF-8 test first, and may decide that UTF-8 is some other encoding. For example, it was common that web sites in UTF-8 containing the name of the German city München were shown as MÃ¼nchen, due to the code deciding it was an ISO-8859 encoding before (or without) even testing to see if it was UTF-8.

UTF-16 is fairly reliable to detect due to the high number of newlines (U+000A) and spaces (U+0020) that should be found when dividing the data into 16-bit words, and large numbers of NUL bytes all at even or odd locations. Common characters must be checked for, relying on a test to see that the text is valid UTF-16 fails: the Windows operating system would mis-detect the phrase "Bush hid the facts" (without a newline) in ASCII as Chinese UTF-16LE, since all the bytes for assigned Unicode characters in UTF-16.

Charset detection is particularly unreliable in Europe, in an environment of mixed ISO-8859 encodings. These are closely related eight-bit encodings that share an overlap in their lower half with ASCII and all arrangements of bytes are valid. There is no technical way to tell these encodings apart and recognising them relies on identifying language features, such as letter frequencies or spellings.

Due to the unreliability of heuristic detection, it is better to properly label datasets with the correct encoding. HTML documents served across the web by HTTP should have their encoding stated out-of-band using the  header.
 Content-Type: text/html;charset=UTF-8

An isolated HTML document, such as one being edited as a file on disk, may imply such a header by a meta tag within the file:
<meta http-equiv="Content-Type" content="text/html;charset=UTF-8" >
or with a new meta type in HTML5
<meta charset="utf-8" >

If the document is Unicode, then some UTF encodings explicitly label the document with an embedded initial byte order mark (BOM).

See also 
 International Components for Unicode - A library that can perform charset detection.
 Language identification
 Content sniffing
 Browser sniffing, a similar heuristic technique for determining the capabilities of a web browser, before serving content to it.

References

External links 
 IMultiLanguage2::DetectInputCodepage
 API reference for ICU charset detection
 Reference for cpdetector charset detection
 Mozilla Charset Detectors
 Java port of Mozilla Charset Detectors
 Delphi/Pascal port of Mozilla Charset Detectors
 uchardet, C++ fork of Mozilla Charset Detectors; includes Bash command-line tool
 C# port of Mozilla Charset Detectors
 HEBCI, a technique for detecting the character set used in form submissions
 Frequency distributions of English trigraphs

Character encoding